Dhaka University Film Society (DUFS) is a voluntary organization affiliated with the Dhaka University Central Students Union (DUCSU) at University of Dhaka. It is registered under the Film Societies Act 2011 and a member of Federation of Film Societies, Bangladesh (FFSB). DUFS is also registered with the Bangladesh Film Censor Board. Dhaka University Film Society (DUFS) started its journey in 1962 during the Film Society Movement. Since then, the organization’s main mission remains the same, which is to create viewers of good movies with adequate taste. The organization had started its journey with the motto, ‘BETTER FILM, BETTER VIEWERS’. It took three decades of consistent performance and unremitting handwork of hundreds of film enthusiasts to reach DUFS’s present glorious position.

Activities
As a part of its mission, DUFS have successfully organized many film oriented programs such as: film festivals, appreciation courses, seminars, workshops, rallies, retrospectives and so on. World Film Manifestation Programme (WFMP) is one of its successful programs with over 400 movie screenings. Some of the major regular festivals of DUFS are 'Amar Bhashar Chalachchitra’, 'International Inter University Short Film Festival’, 'Film for Freshers', ‘World Film Manifestation Program’ and ‘Women's lens film Festival’. Beside these, DUFS has been publishing its official publication Flashback for the past 20 years.

World Film Manifestation Program

World Film Manifestation Program, commonly known as WFMP, is a monthly film screening by DUFS at different cultural centers such as the Goethe-Institut Dhaka and the Alliance Française de Dhaka among others. WFMP's main objective is to introduce classic and contemporary films to film society members. The program is open for all.

DUFS recently organized the 130th edition of WFMP, WFMP on Remembering Agnès Varda at Alliance Française de Dhaka on 22–13 July 2019. 4 films by the French new wave filmmaker were screened.

La Pointe Courte (1955),
Cleo from 5 to 7 (1962),
Le Bonheur (1965),
Vegabond (1985)

The program was started as a "viewer's forum" in June 1998 at the Goethe-Institute Dhaka. The first session was open to everyone. In the next two years, fourteen more sessions were held in different cultural centers in Dhaka. After various sessions, the initiative was renamed as World Film Manifestation Program (WFMP).

The first 1st WFMP session was held in September 2000 at the Goethe-Institute Dhaka.

Flashback
Flashback is the official publication of DUFS. It is published annually for more than fourteen years. The publication is about specific topics in the film industry. The latest issue of flashback on East European Films was published in July 2019. Flashback: Independent Film was published in November 2018. Some issues of the publication included articles about films from Latin America and those from the Far East. One Flashback was centered around Rabindranath Tagore in remembrance of his 150th birth anniversary.

Study circle
The study circle is a weekly program for members moderated by the study circle secretary. The circle discusses a pre-selected topic relevant to films. Study circles are moderated by an expert facilitator on the selected topic. The study circle sessions are open for all.

Others
DUFS regularly organizes film workshops, film orientation courses, and film appreciation courses. The 7th film workshop organized by DUFS was held on 25 July to 9 August. Two short films were produced through the workshop. Film Orientation Courses are designed towards enabling the new members to learn basic knowledge about film viewing and making. Appreciation courses are designed to guide the standard film viewer towards a more insightful understanding of cinema.

DUFS has a library for its members. The library has a rich collection of books on cinema. Members can books and newspapers at the DUFS room.

Besides all these, DUFS organizes a number of film screening sessions throughout the year, often in collaboration with other film societies and cultural centers. "Sunday German-Bangla Film Screening" is held every last Sunday of each month, where one German and one Bengali movie is shown at the Goethe Institute.

Festivals

Dhaka University Film Society organized more than thirty major film festivals so far. It has been playing an active as a cultural organization at the university and the country as well.

Amar Bhasar Chalachitra (Films in my language) is an annual film festival organized by DUFS at the TSC complex. The festival is held every February month in remembrance of the martyrs of the Bengali Language Movement. DUFS organized the 20th edition of the Festival, 'Amar Bhasar Chalachitra 1428' on 22-26 February 2022. The festival was first held in 2004. It is now recognized as the biggest film festival in the Bengali language.

International Inter-University Short Film Festival (IIUSFF) is an annual film festival organized by DUFS. It has been running for over a decade with the slogan "Take your camera, frame your dream". Its goal is to create a cross-cultural platform for university-going filmmakers all over the world. DUFS has recently organized the 11th edition of IIUSFF, in association with the United Nations High Commissioner for Refugees (UNHCR). 1401 short films from more than 90 countries were submitted. Since 10th IIUSFF a new category, 'Short films on refugee' has been introduced to address the refugee crisis around the globe.

'Short film festival on cultural diversity and peace' was introduced in 2019. DUFS and Actionaid Bangladesh jointly organized the event to promote cultural diversity and peace.

Film for Freshers is the yearly film screening for the university freshers. It is open to all freshers. Boichitre Jibon (Diversity is Life) is jointly organized by Dhaka University Film Society and National Disabled Forum, in association with Sightsavers in 2010 and 2013.

The major festivals organized by DUFS at the TSC auditorium, Shawkat Osman Memorial Auditorium and at different cultural centers in Dhaka are as follows.

Membership
New members are admitted in the society in April each year. Only fresher students of Dhaka University are eligible to apply for membership. After an initial screening process, viva-voce (oral interview) is held to select the few successful (around forty) candidates for admission. At present, there are 227 members of whom thirty-three are executive members and others are general members. The current president is Shiyan Shahriar Alamgir; the general secretary is K M Itmam Islam.

Notable alumni
 Abu Shahed Emon has turned himself into a successful filmmaker after his debut full-length feature film Jalaler Golpo

See also
 List of film schools

References

University of Dhaka